Calliprora erethistis is a moth of the family Gelechiidae. It is found in Peru.

The wingspan is 9–10 mm. The forewings are dark violet-grey with a transverse whitish irregularly wedge-shaped spot from the middle of the dorsum reaching three-fourths across the wing. There is a fascia of about seven irregularly longitudinal short fine whitish dashes at three-fourths, the uppermost subcostal, the lowest forming a small dorsal spot. There is a purple-silvery angulated subterminal line and a bronzy-ferruginous streak from the costa beyond this to the apex. The hindwings are dark grey.

References

Moths described in 1922
Calliprora